The Encounter of a Lifetime (Russian: Навстречу жизни) is a 1952  Soviet film directed by Nikolay Lebedev and starring Nadezhda Rumyantseva,  Vladimir Sokolov and Georgi Semyonov.

Plot
One of Leningrad vocational schools charge a complicated order for production of the party machines. Not all workers are equally serious about the assignment. There is a failure. It seems that the perpetrators are found. But to punish is always easier than to help correct the mistakes.

Cast
   Nadezhda Rumyantseva as Marusya Rodnikova  
  Vladimir Sokolov as Pasha Sychev  
 Georgi Semyonov as Semyon Ilyich  
 Sergei Gurzo  as Vasov  
 Vasili Merkuryev 
  Anatoly Kuznetsov   as Marusya's father
 Viktor Khokhryakov as chairman of the graduation committee

References

Bibliography 
 Peter Kenez. Cinema and Soviet Society: From the Revolution to the Death of Stalin. Tauris, 2001.

External links 
 

1952 films
Soviet drama films
1950s Russian-language films
Lenfilm films